Attobrou is a town in south-eastern Ivory Coast. It is a sub-prefecture of Agboville Department in Agnéby-Tiassa Region, Lagunes District.

Attobrou was a commune until March 2012, when it became one of 1126 communes nationwide that were abolished.

In 2014, the population of the sub-prefecture of Attobrou was 20,454

Villages
The 5 villages of the sub-prefecture of Attobrou and their population in 2014 are:
 Attobrou (8 556)
 Boguié (1 436)
 Copa (2 679)
 Séguié (4 232)
 Yadio (3 551

References

Sub-prefectures of Agnéby-Tiassa
Former communes of Ivory Coast